Gibson Lake is a lake in geographic Biggar Township, Nipissing District in Northeastern Ontario, Canada. It is in the Saint Lawrence River drainage basin and lies within Algonquin Provincial Park. The  major outflow, at the southwest, is Gibson Creek which flows to the Nipissing River, and then via the Petawawa River and the Ottawa River to the Saint Lawrence River.

See also
List of lakes in Ontario

References

Other map sources:

Lakes of Nipissing District